Tidelands is the second studio album by American rock band The Moondoggies. It was released in October 2010 under Hardly Art.

Track listing

References

2010 albums